Comitas yokoyamai is an extinct species of sea snail, a marine gastropod mollusc in the family Pseudomelatomidae.

Description

Distribution
Fossils of this species were found  in Cenozoic and  Pliocene strata in  Japan.

References

 Yokoyama, M., 1920: Fossils from the Miura peninsula and its immediate north. Journal of the College of Science, Imperial University of Tokyo, vol. 39, art. 6, pp. 1–193, pls. 1–20
 Taki, I. and Oyama, K., 1954: Matajiro Yokoyama's the Pliocene and later faunas from the Kwanto region in Japan. Palaeontological Society of Japan, Special Papers, no. 2, pp. 1–68, pls. 1–49
 Oyama, K., 1973: Revision of Matajiro Yokoyama's type Mollusca from the Tertiary and Quaternary of the Kanto area. Palaeontological Society of Japan, Special Papers, no. 17, pp. 1–148, pls. 1–57

External links
 University Museum, University of Tokyo: Comitas yokoyamai

yokoyamai
Gastropods described in 1954